Korfball in Catalonia has been played since 1982, and is managed by the Catalan Korfball Federation (FCK). In 1997, the International Korfball Federation admitted the Catalan Korfball Federation as a provisional member, and finally in 2006 there was the full membership application.

Catalan teams

The Catalan competition is divided in a "First division" and a "Second division"

Catalan korfball clubs are:
 C.K. Vacarisses
 C.E. Vilanova i la Geltrú
 C.K. Assessoria Vallparadís
 C.K. Cerdanyola
 C.K. Badalona – La Rotllana
 Sant Llorenç K.C.
 U.K.S.A. – Unió Korfbalera Sant Adrià de Besòs 
 K.C. Barcelona 
 C.K. Castellbisbal 
 K.E.C.A. – Korfbal Esplai Ca n'Anglada
 Korfball Valldemia
 A.A.E.I.E.S. Secretari Coloma de Barcelona

Catalonia championships
Title winners

9  CK Egara 85: (1985–86, 1986–87, 1987–88, 1988–89, 1989–90, 1990–91, 1991–92, 1992–93 and 1993–94)
6  CK Vacarisses: (2004–05, 2005–06, 2006–07, 2007–08, 2008–09 and 2009–10) 
5  Sant Llorenç KC: (1994–95, 1995–96, 1996–97, 1999–2000 and 2000–01)
5  CK l'Autònoma:  (1997–98, 1998–99, 2001–02, 2002–03 and 2003–04)

National team

See also
Korfball World Championship
European Korfball Championship

External links
 Korfball Catalan Federation
 International Korfball Federation